Wild in the Streets was the sixth album by the rock band Helix, released in 1987.

The album went gold in the band's native Canada, but only managed a disappointing #179 on the Billboard 200 in the United States. The band would lose their U.S. deal with Capitol Records soon after.

The power ballad "Dream On" is a cover of a 1982 song by Nazareth. "She's Too Tough" was written in 1985 by Def Leppard vocalist Joe Elliott.
Def Leppard's version of the song was intended at one time to be on their Hysteria album, but it was never released until 1993's "Heaven Is" single, and later  1993's Retro Active album.

The original Canadian cassette issue of this album came in a glow-in-the-dark cassette shell.

Track listing
"Wild in the Streets"  (Paul Hackman / Ray Lyell) –3:42 
"Never Gonna Stop the Rock" (Chris Overland / Steve Overland) – 4:36 
"Dream On" (Billy Rankin / Manny Charlton) – 3:43 
"What Ya Bringin' to the Party" (Paul Hackman / Ray Lyell) – 4:02 
"High Voltage Kicks" (Paul Hackman / Brian Vollmer) – 4:19 
"Give 'Em Hell" (Paul Hackman / Brian Vollmer) – 3:36 
"Shot Full of Love" (Brian Vollmer) – 4:27 
"Love Hungry Eyes" (Paul Hackman / Brian Vollmer) – 4:00 
"She's Too Tough" (Joe Elliott) – 3:29 
"Kiss It Goodbye" (Brian Vollmer) – 3:27

Personal

Band members
Brian Vollmer – lead vocals
Brent "Doctor" Doerner – guitars, backing vocals
Paul Hackman – guitars, backing vocals
Daryl Gray – bass, keyboards, piano, backing vocals
Greg "Fritz" Hinz – drums, backing vocals

Additional personal
Don Airey, Sam Reid – additional keyboards
Mickey Curry, Brian Doerner, Matthew Frenette – additional drums

Production
Produced at Metalworks Studios, Toronto, Ontario, Canada
Mike Stone – Engineer, mixing at Town House, London, England
Ed Stone – Producer (all tracks), Engineer, Pre-producer
Neil Kernon – Producer (tracks 1, 6)
Lorraine Francis, Nick Blundell, Bill Kennedy – assistant engineers
Ken Heague – tour manager
Eric Gillespie, Jacqueline Barlow, Shelley Taylor, Sue Bradford, Tim O'Donnell, Neil Warnock, Vinny Cinquemani, Bill Elson and William Seip – management

Singles
Wild in the Streets
Dream On

Charts

Album

References

Helix (band) albums
1987 albums
Albums produced by Mike Stone (record producer)
Albums produced by Neil Kernon
Capitol Records albums